The Way Out may refer to:

Films
 The Way Out (1915 film), a 1915 American drama featuring Harry Carey
 The Way Out (1918 film), a 1918 American drama film made by World Film Company 
 The Way Out (1955 film), also called Dial 999
 The Way Out (2014 film), a 2014 Czech-French film
 The Way Out (2015 film), a 2015 German-Russian short film

Music
 The Way Out (The Books album)
 The Way Out (Drag album)
 The Way Out (Hayley Orrantia EP)
 The Way Out, a 1990s Britpop band who created the theme for This Life

Published media
 The Way Out (book), a 2006 self-help book for gay men by Christopher Lee Nutter
 The Way Out, a 1946 book by Uys Krige about a World War II prison escape
 The Way Out, a 1933 novel by Upton Sinclair
 The Way Out, a 1936 novel by Harry Martinson

Other uses
 "The Way Out", a 2014 episode of the TV series Outlander

See also 
 A Way Out (disambiguation)